Tatyana Mikhailovna Karpova (17 January 1916 – 26 February 2018) was a Soviet and Russian stage and film actress.

Born in what became Kharkiv, Ukraine, on 17 January 1916, Karpova began acting at the age of 13. She joined the Mayakovsky Theatre in 1938. In 1960, Karpova was named a People's Artist of the RSFSR, and designated a People's Artist of the USSR in 1990. She retired in 2003, and died in Moscow at the age of 102 on 26 February 2018.

References

External links

1916 births
2018 deaths
20th-century Russian actresses
21st-century Russian actresses
Actors from Kharkiv
Honored Artists of the RSFSR
People's Artists of the RSFSR
People's Artists of the USSR
Stalin Prize winners
Recipients of the Order of Honour (Russia)
Recipients of the Order of the Red Banner of Labour
Soviet film actresses
Soviet stage actresses
Russian centenarians
Russian film actresses
Russian stage actresses
Women centenarians

Burials in Troyekurovskoye Cemetery